Frederica "Freda" Detmers (January 16, 1867—September 5, 1934) was an American botanist.

Life and education 
Detmers was born in Dixon, Lee County, Illinois on January 16, 1867 to Henry Detmers and Heimke. Her father was the founder of the Ohio State University Veterinary College. She studied at the University, graduating in 1887 with a B.S. She returned to graduate with an M.S. in 1891.

She suffered from a head injury after a fall in the mountains collecting plants in 1930.

She committed suicide on September 5, 1934 in Los Angeles by consuming poison.

Career 
Detmers was the first woman to hold a research position in Ohio for the Ohio Agricultural Experiment Station, holding it from 1880 to 1892. From 1893 to 1906, she taught science and German in Columbus schools, returning to OSU in 1906. Her 1912 dissertation was a study of Buckeye Lake's ecology. In 1914, she became assistant professor. In 1918, she rejoined the experiment station as assistant botanist, moving on to taxonomist and systematist.

Her research focused on plant pathology problems and weed naturalization and control.

She was a charter member of the Ohio Academy of Science, where in 1918, she served as vice president.

Detmers moved to Los Angeles in 1927, becoming a curator of the University of Southern California herbarium.

Partial bibliography 
 Detmers, Frederica. An Ecological Study of Buckeye Lake. Columbus, Ohio: 1912.

References

1867 births
1934 deaths
Ohio State University alumni
American women botanists
American botanists
Ohio State University faculty
American women academics
1934 suicides
Suicides by poison
Suicides in California